Glandon is a commune in the Haute-Vienne department in the Nouvelle-Aquitaine region in west-central France.

Inhabitants are known as Glandonais.

Geography 
Glandon lies Southeast of Périgord-Limousin National Regional Park and South of Saint-Yrieix-la-Perche, another French commune. Two rivers cross the Glandon: the Boucheuse river and the Mud river.

See also
 Communes of the Haute-Vienne department

References

Communes of Haute-Vienne